Lee S. Ainslie III is the head of hedge fund Maverick Capital. He is a value investor that is particularly known for his investments in the technology sector.

Early life and education
Ainslie's father was headmaster of Episcopal High School, a private school in Alexandria, Virginia from which Ainslie graduated. Ainslie holds a bachelor's degree from the University of Virginia and an MBA from the University of North Carolina at Chapel Hill Kenan–Flagler Business School.

Career
Prior to joining Maverick, Ainslie worked at Tiger Management Corp, where he and other former employees had been nicknamed "tiger cubs" in the hedge fund industry. Ainslie helped form Maverick Capital in 1993 at the invitation of billionaire Sam Wyly. Maverick Capital Management LP was reported to have $9 billion under management at year-end 2013.

Ainslie has been profiled in books such as Hedge Hunters, by Katherine Burton, New Investment Superstars by Lois Peltz. and The Big Win by Stephen Weiss.

Ainslie supported Mitt Romney in the 2012 U.S. presidential election. He is on the board of directors of the charitable organization the Robin Hood Foundation.

Personal life
He and his wife Elizabeth have two sons.

References

External links
 "A calm exterior; Lee Ainslie's soft-spoken demeanor cloaks a hard-headed investor with a relentless focus on performance.(Face to Face Lee Ainslie)," Pensions & Investments, June 11, 2007
 "How Lee Ainslie does it," Investment News, February 11, 2008
 "The Legend of Robin Hood," Fortune, September 8, 2006
 "Wall Street's Elite," Forbes, September 10, 2001
 "Inside a hedge fund: An interview with the managing partner of Maverick Capital," McKinsey Quarterly, April 2006
 "Lee Ainslie, Founder & Managing Partner - Maverick Capital," OneWire interview on YouTube

Tiger Management
American hedge fund managers
Living people
University of Virginia alumni
UNC Kenan–Flagler Business School alumni
1964 births